David Rodman (born 10 September 1983) is a Slovenian professional ice hockey player who plays for DVTK Jegesmedvék of the Tipsport Liga in Slovakia.

He previously played with the Graz99ers of the EBEL during the 2014–15 season, on 15 January 2015, from Swedish HockeyAllsvenskan club, IK Oskarshamn. On 8 August 2015 Rodman returned to the Germany second tier, signing a one-year deal with Dresdner Eislöwen of the DEL2.

He participated at several Ice Hockey World Championships as a member of the Slovenia men's national ice hockey team.

His elder brother Marcel also played the sport professionally.

Career statistics

Regular season and playoffs

International

References

External links

1983 births
Living people
Brûleurs de Loups players
Dresdner Eislöwen players
EHC Black Wings Linz players
Graz 99ers players
HK Acroni Jesenice players
Ice hockey players at the 2014 Winter Olympics
Ice hockey players at the 2018 Winter Olympics
IK Oskarshamn players
Olympic ice hockey players of Slovenia
SC Bietigheim-Bissingen players
Slovenian ice hockey right wingers
Sportspeople from Jesenice, Jesenice
HDD Jesenice players
Val-d'Or Foreurs players
Vienna Capitals players
Slovenian expatriate sportspeople in Austria
Slovenian expatriate sportspeople in Germany
Slovenian expatriate sportspeople in France
Slovenian expatriate sportspeople in Canada
Slovenian expatriate sportspeople in Sweden
Slovenian expatriate sportspeople in Hungary
Expatriate ice hockey players in Austria
Expatriate ice hockey players in Germany
Expatriate ice hockey players in France
Expatriate ice hockey players in Canada
Expatriate ice hockey players in Sweden
Expatriate ice hockey players in Hungary
Slovenian expatriate ice hockey people